New Zimbabwe Parliament Building is a government-owned building in Zimbabwe, built to replace the old Parliament House in Harare. The building with six floors is intended to house both the upper and lower houses of the Zimbabwean Parliament. The parliamentary chambers within the high-rise can accommodate up to 650 legislators, their offices, conference rooms and meeting spaces. The engineering, procurement and construction (EPC) contract was awarded to Shanghai Construction Group, who erected the building between December 2018 and April 2022.

Location

Overview
Under construction since November 2018, the office complex consists of six floors, arranged in concentric circles around a central parliamentary chamber with a seating capacity of 650 people. Exterior surface parking for 800 vehicles will be provided in the development. The construction was funded with a US$140 million grant by the Government of China to the Zimbabwean government.

History
Zimbabwe's first parliamentary building was constructed in the late 19th century by the colonial rulers of the country. That building had a capacity of 100 legislators. The old building was too small for the 350 legislators and estimated 248 support staff, as of July 2020. The idea of relocating parliament to this site was first conceived in 1983. The construction plans for the new building were approved in October 2017. Construction began in November 2018. Shanghai Construction Group, one of the largest construction companies in the world, was awarded the EPC contract at a monetary price of US$140 million. It is expected that construction will be complete during the second quarter of 2022.

Recent developments
As of March 2022, the work completed was estimated at 95 percent. Work was ongoing on the two unfinished floors and the parking lot would be developed after the main building is completed.

Other considerations
The government of Zimbabwe has ambitions to turn Mount Hampden into a satellite city by relocating the judiciary and government ministries to this location in the future. The new Zimbabwe Parliament Building is expected to stimulate the construction of new residences and commercial development in the neighborhood.

See also
 Politics of Zimbabwe
 Harare

References

External links
 Architectural Design of New Zimbabwe Parliament Building

Buildings and structures in Zimbabwe
Mashonaland West Province
Legislative buildings
2022 establishments in Africa
Buildings and structures completed in 2022
Seats of national legislatures